Jack Maynard Cholmondeley Easton, GC (28 May 1906 – 29 November 1994) was an officer of the Royal Naval Volunteer Reserve (RNVR) who was awarded the George Cross for gallantry in defusing a parachute mine at Hoxton, the East End of London, during the Blitz on 17 October 1940. Notice of his award appeared in the London Gazette on 23 January 1941.

Early life and career
Easton was born 28 May 1906, son of Percy and Kathleen Easton. He was educated at Brighton College and Pangbourne College, and was a solicitor by profession, entering the family firm, William Easton & Sons.

Second World War
As a RNVR sub-lieutenant, he had been trained in naval ordnance disposal. The Luftwaffe had started dropping parachute adapted naval mines, with variable fusing. Naval disposal teams were detailed to deal with these. Easton, with his assistant Bennett Southwell attempted to defuse a mine suspended inside a damaged house. When the fusing engaged, the two men evacuated the house, but were caught by the explosion. Easton was seriously wounded, and Southwell killed, both being later awarded the George Cross.

Later in the war Jack Easton skippered armed trawlers and minesweepers.

Personal life
In 1929, Easton married Felicity Field; they had a daughter, Juliet. In later life he married a cousin, Joan Bartman. Aged 88, Easton died in Chichester, Sussex.

References

Further reading

External links
 Heroes of the Royal Navy, Navy News, October 2007, page 12

British recipients of the George Cross
Royal Navy recipients of the George Cross
Royal Naval Volunteer Reserve personnel of World War II
English solicitors
1994 deaths
People educated at Pangbourne College
Bomb disposal personnel
1906 births
20th-century English lawyers
Royal Navy officers of World War II
People from Maidenhead
Military personnel from Berkshire